Shrinkage fields is a random field-based machine learning technique that aims to perform high quality image restoration (denoising and deblurring) using low computational overhead.

Method 
The restored image  is predicted from a corrupted observation  after training on a set of sample images .

A shrinkage (mapping) function  is directly modeled as a linear combination of radial basis function kernels, where  is the shared precision parameter,  denotes the (equidistant) kernel positions, and M is the number of Gaussian kernels.

Loss-minimization is used to learn the model parameters .

Performance 

Advantages 
 Results are comparable to those obtained by BM3D (reference in state of the art denoising since its inception in 2007)
 Minimal runtime compared to other high-performance methods (potentially applicable within embedded devices)
 Parallelizable (e.g.: possible GPU implementation)
 Predictability:  runtime where  is the number of pixels
 Fast training even with CPU

Implementations 
 A reference implementation has been written in MATLAB and released under the BSD 2-Clause license: shrinkage-fields

See also 
 Random field
 Discrete Fourier transform
 Convolution
 Noise reduction
 Deblurring

References

 

Image noise reduction techniques